The Australian Professional Rodeo Association (APRA) is the national governing body for professional rodeo in Australia. Founded in 1944, APRA has been setting the standards for rodeo in Australia for over 60 years. The Australian Rodeo consists of many events some of which are junior and ladies' (open) barrel racing, saddle bronc riding, bull riding, bareback bronc riding, rope and tie, steer wrestling, team roping and the steer ride. Men, women and children are involved in the Australian rodeo circuit.

National Finals Rodeo
The premier event for Australian Rodeo is the Australia National Finals Rodeo. It was first held in 1960 in Queensland.

Controversy over animal welfare 

Controversy currently surrounds the rodeo industry in Australia. As the APRA is a self-regulating body, concerns have been raised by animal welfare groups and the Australian Veterinary Association regarding the ethical treatment of animals used in rodeo events. These concerns include the lack of animal welfare policing at events and the non-mandatory attendance of veterinary professionals. Cattle prods and shocking devices have been seen to be used gratuitously despite this practice being in opposition to the APRA code.

Rodeo events are banned in the Australian Capital Territory.

See also

Equestrian Australia

References

External links

Rodeo in Australia
Rodeo organizations
Sports governing bodies in Australia
Equestrian sports in Australia
1944 establishments in Australia
Sports organizations established in 1944